I'm Alive is an American reality television series that featured death-defying stories of people determined to survive any kind of animal attacks, including reenactments by actors, although deaths had occurred. The series premiered on Animal Planet on October 9, 2009 and ended its run on May 19, 2011. No further episodes were produced beyond the end date.

Episodes

Season One (2009)

Season Two (2011)

References

External links

2009 American television series debuts
2011 American television series endings
Animal Planet original programming